Hyperthaema cardinalis is a moth of the subfamily Arctiinae. It was described by Staudinger in 1875. It is found in Peru.

References

Phaegopterina
Moths described in 1875